Richard Jay-Alexander (born May 24, 1953) is an American Broadway producer and director. He served as Executive Director of the New York City office of producer Cameron Mackintosh for twelve years, known for productions including Les Misérables, Cats, The Phantom of the Opera, Miss Saigon, Five Guys Named Moe, Oliver! and Putting It Together.

His directorial credits include the staging of For The Girls (2020) on Broadway starring Kristin Chenoweth, Porgy and Bess for the South Florida Symphony (2019), the concert versions of Les Miz (2008) and Guys and Dolls (2009), both at the Hollywood Bowl.

Jay-Alexander is a long time board member of Broadway Cares/Equity Fights AIDS and has directed benefits for the honored organization, as well as other causes he cares about, including animals and no-kill shelters, the Make-A-Wish Foundation of South Florida, The Actor's Fund, National Asian Artists Project (NAAP), Broadway Dreams, and Hollywood's Motion Picture and Television Fund (MPTF).

He is passionate about young talent and teaches workshops and master classes, when possible. For the last few years, he has been the camp director of Kristin Chenoweth's Broadway Bootcamp.

Early life and career 

Richard is one of five children, born to a mother from Havana, Cuba and a father who was Spanish-American. The name change came as a result of someone else having the same name and the unions not allowing multiples.

Jay-Alexander began his Broadway career in 1977 as a production assistant on the Broadway revival of Porgy and Bess, produced by Sherwin M. Goldman and the Houston Grand Opera. He also served as a production assistant on the pre-Broadway try out of Nefertiti which starred Andrea Marcovicci and directed by Jack O'Brien.

As a director, writer, and producer his career has taken him around the globe as far away as Alaska and Singapore and from London's Royal Albert Hall and Royal Festival Hall to Carnegie Hall, The Sydney Opera House, The Village Vanguard, Feinstein's/54 Below in New York City, Laxness Arena-Cologne, Germany, The Metropolitan Opera House, The Hollywood Bowl, Joe's Pub at The Public Theatre, Brooklyn's Barclays Center, Bloomfield Stadium in Tel Aviv, London's O2 Arena, O2 World Berlin, and just about every other legitimate theatre, nightclub and cabaret in between.

Jay-Alexander has also contributed lyrics to projects for Disney Records. He is a regular contributor to Broadwayworld.com where he is particularly known for a series called "All Eyes On," interviewing Angela Lansbury, Josh Groban, Sir Ian McKellen, Rose Marie, Bob Avian, Ann-Margret, and Barry Manilow about his Broadway-bound Harmony. He has also authored liner notes for reissues of musicals such as the original, Jacques Brel is Alive and Well and Living in Paris, and four titles from the Stephen Sondheim Columbia Masterworks/Sony canon: Merrily We Roll Along, Into The Woods, Sweeney Todd: The Demon Barber of Fleet Street, and Sunday In The Park With George, giving them context all these years later as to their place in history and with 20-20 hindsight.

Later work 
Jay-Alexander has worked with many performers, including Kristin Chenoweth, Bernadette Peters, Barbra Streisand, Bette Midler, Julie Andrews, Brian Stokes Mitchell, Lea Salonga, Sam Harris, Polly Bergen, Russell Watson, Il Volo, Il Divo, Norm Lewis, Laurie Beechman, Debby Boone, Mandy Gonzalez, Mary Cleere Haran, Roslyn Kind, Melissa Errico, Lea Michele, Betty Buckley, Donny & Marie Osmond, Ricky Martin, Well-Strung, Donna McKechnie, Melora Hardin, Jennifer Leigh Warren, and others.

For several years he has directed the Chaplin Awards for Film at Lincoln Center. The annual event has honored Barbra Streisand, Robert Redford, Rob Reiner, Robert De Niro, Morgan Freeman, Helen Mirren, as well as the 50th Anniversary Gala. Spike Lee was to be honored in the spring of 2020, but due to COVID-19 has been moved to a future date.

His work with Barbra Streisand can be seen on various DVD products or PBS specials including: Streisand: 2006 Tour; Barbra Streisand: One Night Only at The Village Vanguard; Barbra Streisand: Back to Brooklyn; Barbra: The Music, The Mem'ries, The Magic (Netflix).

He also brought hit songwriter Desmond Child back to the stage, after a 30-year absence, and debuted a show at Feinstein's 54 Below which was later filmed for PBS as part of The Kate Series in Connecticut.

In 2018, Richard co-produced the Norm Lewis Christmas Album with Mr. Lewis and they have done an annual Christmas concert run at Feinstein's 54 Below since 2015.

His work can also be seen on Live From Lincoln Center with exemplary concerts such as Kristin Chenoweth: The Dames of Broadway... All of 'em!!! (2013) and Norm Lewis: Who Am I? (2015).

From 2013 to 2018, Richard directed the Latin Songwriters Hall of Fame, La Musa Awards. Founded by Desmond Child and Rudy Amado Pérez, the awards featured Latin stars, composers, lyricists, bands, legendary musicians, and industry recording executives.

In 2009, Richard helmed a production of I Do! I Do! starring real-life married couple, Paige Davis and Patrick Page at San Diego's Old Globe Theatre. He was thrilled about this because the first show he ever directed in college was The Fantasticks, also by Tom Jones and Harvey Schmidt. In 2017 he was asked to direct an evening honoring the two legends and their prestigious careers receiving the Oscar Hammerstein II Award by the York Theatre Company.

He directed, what he claims, to be his final Les Miz at the legendary Muny in St. Louis in summer of 2013. He promised it would be his last having directed and staged 11 productions of the legendary musical since 1987, including the first-ever bilingual company in Montreal performing five performances a week in French and three in English, produced by Cameron Mackintosh and Ed and David Mirvish. Richard also directed the original Canadian production in Toronto with an all Canadian cast, and its subsequent Canadian tour.

In 2005, Richard directed A Safe Harbor for Elizabeth Bishop written by Brazil's Marta Góes. It was the first English translation and starred Amy Irving. The show was a part of the New York Stage and Film Summer Program at Vassar College where poet, Ms. Bishop, attended. It then moved to New York City and played Primary Stages in the spring of 2006.

In 2002, Richard directed his first original gay-themed play titled, The Nature of the Beach, written by David Sexton.

Richard directed two shows in Las Vegas; Storm at the Mandalay Bay and the reboot of Donny & Marie at The Flamingo in the Flamingo Hotel and Showroom.

In 2011, he worked with opera singer Deborah Voigt directing a theatrical piece entitled "Deborah Voigt, Voigt Lessons" which was written by Terrence McNally and originally developed by Voigt, McNally and director Francesca Zambello.

In 1998 in Miami, he presented a prestigious series with Ellen Wedner called "Manhattan Nights in Miami." It featured performances by David Campbell, John Bucchino, Mary Cleere Haran, Sir Richard Rodney Bennett, Steven Brinberg (as Simply Barbra), and Barbara Cook.

In the early '80s, after being part of the original cast and an assistant stage manager for Amadeus on Broadway, he directed the national tours.

He directed the Spanish World Premiere of Peter Shaffer's Amadeus at the Teatro Nacional in Santiago Chile.

Richard opened well attended venues including The Kodak Theatre in Hollywood, California with Russell Watson; Toronto's Skydome with a concert version of Les Misérables, co-directed by Keith Batten; The Dr. Phillips Center for the Performing Arts and their Walt Disney Theatre with a cast of Norm Lewis, Sierra Boggess, Chris Mann, Deborah Voigt, Michael Urie, Jane Monheit, Ektor Rivera, The Lombard Twins, and The Broadway Kids.

Stage performances

 Amadeus – 1980
 Zoot Suit – 1978
 The Me Nobody Knows – 1977
 Boy Meets Boy – 1976

Recordings 
He has produced, co-produced, and executive produced many recordings and original cast albums including:

Johnny Mathis On Broadway; Sondheim, Etc.: Bernadette Peters Live at Carnegie Hall (Grammy Nomination); Bernadette Peters Loves Rodgers & Hammerstein (Grammy Nomination); Brian Stokes Mitchell's solo debut album; Mary Cleere Haran's Pennies From Heaven; Melora Hardin's All The Way To Mars; the original Broadway cast recording of Five Guys Named Moe; and most recently, the Norm Lewis Christmas Album.

Stage production

 Five Guys Named Moe – Associate Director / Executive Producer – 1992
 Miss Saigon – Executive Producer – 1991
 Les Misérables – Associate Director / Executive Producer – 1987
 Song and Dance – Stage manager – 1985
 Oliver! – Assistant stage manager / Dance captain – 1984
 Amadeus – Assistant stage manager – 1980

External links

References 
 

1953 births
People from Solvay, New York
Living people
American male musical theatre actors
State University of New York at Oswego alumni